Tracy Osborn is a former American women's soccer player. Buckley's greatest achievement was winning the 1997 FA Women's Cup Final. She was the first American to win the Women's FA Cup.

Honors
Millwall
 FA Women's Cup: 1997

References

Living people
Millwall Lionesses L.F.C. players
Damallsvenskan players
Umeå IK players
Women's association football midfielders
American women's soccer players
Year of birth missing (living people)